Raising Waylon is a 2004 American romantic comedy television film directed by Sam Pillsbury.

Synopsis
Reginald and Julia are obliged to raise the son of their friends who have died in an accident, because they are his godfather and godmother.

Cast
Thomas Gibson: Reginald Robellati
Poppy Montgomery: Julia Bellows
Doris Roberts: Marie
Catherine Boniface: Tracy
Jeremy Bergman: Waylon Moore
Ross Anderson: M. Myers
Susan Brady: Terry Allen
Katrina Browne: Valerie
Latham Gaines: Paul
Craig Hall: Alex
Elizabeth Hawthorne: Judge Harriet Caldwell
John Leigh: Jeremy
Jim McLarty: Craig Stanfill
Ingrid Park: Kim
Jennifer Rucker: Receptionist
Michael Saccente: Jay Hessler
Roy Snow: Randell
Xavier Strom: Sam Stanfill
Jared Tobin: Jimmy
Tandi Wright: Tina Stanfill

References

External links
 
 

2004 television films
2004 films
2004 romantic comedy films
2000s English-language films
American comedy television films
American romantic comedy films
CBS network films
Films directed by Sam Pillsbury
Romance television films
2000s American films